The American Renaissance was a period of American architecture and the arts from 1876 to 1917, characterized by renewed national self-confidence and a feeling that the United States was the heir to Greek democracy, Roman law, and Renaissance humanism. The era spans the period between the Centennial Exposition (celebrating the 100th anniversary of the signing of the Declaration of Independence) and the United States' entry into World War I.

Characteristics
During the period of the American Renaissance, the United States' preoccupation with national identity (or New Nationalism) was expressed by modernism and technology, as well as academic classicism. It expressed its self-confidence in new technologies, such as the wire cables of  the Brooklyn Bridge in New York City. It found its cultural outlets in Prairie School houses and in Beaux-Arts architecture and sculpture, in the "City Beautiful" movement, and in the creation of the American empire. Americans felt that their civilization was uniquely the modern heir, and that it had come of age.  Politically and economically, this era coincides with the Gilded Age and the New Imperialism.

The classical architecture of the World's Columbian Exposition in Chicago, Illinois in 1893 was a demonstration that impressed Henry Adams, who wrote that people "would some day talk about Hunt and Richardson, La Farge and Saint-Gaudens, Burnham and McKim and Stanford White, when their politicians and millionaires were quite forgotten."

In the dome of the reading room at the new Library of Congress, Edwin Blashfield's murals were on the given theme, The Evolution of Civilization.

The exhibition American Renaissance: 1876–1917 at the Brooklyn Museum, 1979, encouraged the revival of interest in this movement.

Notable examples
Cuyahoga County Courthouse (1906–1912): the exterior includes sculpture by Karl Bitter, Daniel Chester French, Herbert Adams, Isidore Konti and Herman Matzen, while the interior contains murals by Frank Brangwyn, Violet Oakley, Charles Yardley Turner, Max Bohm and Frederick Wilson. A stained glass window was designed and executed by Frederick Wilson and Charles Schweinfurth.
San Francisco City Hall (completed 1915): designed by Arthur Brown, Jr, who also designed several other buildings in the style in San Francisco, including the San Francisco War Memorial Opera House, Veterans Building, Temple Emanuel, Coit Tower and the Federal office building at 50 United Nations Plaza.

Notes

References
Howard Mumford Jones, "The Renaissance and American origins," Ideas in America 1945.
Richard Guy Wilson, "The great civilization", forward essay to The American Renaissance 1876–1917. Exhibition catalogue, The Brooklyn Museum, 1979–1980.
Henry Hope Reed, The Golden City, (New York: Norton Library) 1971, Ch. 3:"The American contribution" pp 62–98.

 Reynolds, David S. Beneath the American Renaissance: The Subversive Imagination in the Age of Emerson and Melville. New York: Knopf, 1988; rpt., New York: Oxford University Press, 2011.

American architectural styles
Neoclassical movements